Hochatown is a community in McCurtain County, Oklahoma, United States, the second to hold the name after the first was flooded by the damming of the Mountain Fork River to create Broken Bow Lake. The city lies within the Little Dixie region of Oklahoma, an area originally settled largely by Southerners seeking a new start following the Civil War.

Demographics

History

First Hochatown 

The land that would become Hochatown was owned by the Choctaw tribe, with twelve families moving into the area in the 1880s. Like Broken Bow, Hochatown grew around the Choctaw Lumber and Coal Company, (later named Dierks)  gaining a post office in 1894 and become a bustling town by 1900. The lumber company built a railroad spur between Hochatown and the community of Eagletown, Oklahoma to facilitate export of logs.

At the time of its founding, Hochatown was located in Bok Tuklo County of the Apukshunnubbee District, one of three administrative super-regions comprising the Choctaw Nation.

During the 1920s and 1930s, prime lumber supply dwindled and the lumber company moved to other local areas. Meanwhile, the community became noted for its moonshine production. The town's heyday soon passed, however. The post office shut down in 1963 and the last family left the site in 1966. The cemetery and town church were moved to higher ground while all other buildings were destroyed. The area is now covered by 200+ feet of water.

Second Hochatown

The second incarnation of Hochatown is located approximately one mile west of Broken Bow Lake on U.S. Route 259. Its economy is based on tourism. In addition to  Broken Bow Lake, the area includes Beavers Bend Resort Park, Hochatown State Park, and Cedar Creek Golf Course at Beavers Bend. Hunters also visit the region, which bills itself as the "deer capital of the world."

On Monday, November 28, 2022, McCurtain County Commissioners gathered to pass articles of incorporation to re-establish Hochatown as an incorporated municipality.

Back to our Roots

ESTABLISHED 1835 * FOUNDED 2022

November 8, 2022 Hochatown residents voted overwhelmingly in favor of the ballot question proposing the incorporation of HochaTown.  McCurtain County Election Board Secretary Kelly Donaldson certified the result of the election as 129 votes in favor of incorporation and 18 votes against. A final certification was made by McCurtain County Commissioner's Resolution, November 28, 2022.

On Tuesday, January 10th, 2023 the first meeting of the town trustees for newly incorporated Hochatown was held at the Chapel of the Pines Church.  During the meeting, the Trustees voted unanimously to appoint Dian Jordan, PhD, as the town’s first official Mayor and accepted a donation from long-time resident Vojai Reed for one year of free office space to house the first official Town Hall.

Hochatown, the small southeastern Oklahoma village that waged a 30-year battle to become incorporated, has begun its effort to build a municipal government.

References

unincorporated communities in McCurtain County, Oklahoma
Ghost towns in Oklahoma